Robert Stebbins or Bob Stebbins may refer to:

Robert Stebbins, pen name of American filmmaker Sidney Meyers (1906–1969)
Robert C. Stebbins  (1915–2013), American herpetologist and illustrator
Robert C. Stebbins, United States consul taken hostage in the 1975 AIA building hostage crisis
Bob Stebbins (actor) (born 1928) American actor and film editor